New Athos or Akhali Atoni (Akhali Atoni; , Afon Ch'yts; ; Novy Afon, Neos Athos) is a town in the Gudauta raion of Abkhazia situated some  from Sukhumi by the shores of the Black Sea. The town was previously known under the names Nikopol, Acheisos, Anakopia, Nikopia, Nikofia, Nikopsis, Absara, and Psyrtskha.

New Athos Cave is one of Abkhazia's tourist attractions.

History

The excavations at the Anacopia fortress which is located at the edge of the town showed that it functioned in the 5-12 centuries CE, though some archeologists date the construction of the defences to 7th century. Anacopia is associated with the fortress of Tracheia mentioned by Prokopius. Anacopia was the capital of the Abkhazian princedom in the orbit of the Byzantine Empire and then of the Abkhazian Kingdom after the archon Leon II declared himself a king in the late 8th century. Later, the capital was moved to Kutaisi.

Anacopia was ceded to Byzantine Empire by Demetre in 1033 but was retaken by Georgians in 1072 among the other territories Georgia gained as a result of the Empire's defeat at Manzikert at the hands of Seljuks.

According to a tradition Simon the Zealot died in Abkhazia having come there on a missionary trip and was buried in Nicopsis. His remains were transferred to Anacopia in the 14–15 centuries.

Geography
Located between the Black Sea and the Iverian Mountain, New Athos is 17 km far from Gudauta, 22 from Sukhumi and 84 from the Russian borders at Vesyoloye, a village near the city of Sochi.

Administration
Vitali Smyr was reappointed as Mayor on 10 May 2001 following the March 2001 local elections.

On 8 May 2003, Smyr was appointed Minister for Agriculture and released as Mayor of New Athos. On 19 May, Feliks Dautia was appointed his successor.

List of mayors

Main sights

Monastery

In 1874 Russian monks from the overcrowded Rossikon Monastery on Mount Athos arrived to the Caucasus in order to find a place for possible resettlement. They feared that the Ottoman Empire would oust the Russians from Athos after the outbreak of the impending Russo-Turkish War. They selected Psyrtskha, and the Neo-Byzantine New Athos Monastery, dedicated to St. Simon the Canaanite, was constructed there in the 1880s with funds provided by Tsar Alexander III of Russia. Eventually Russian monks were permitted to stay in the "old" Athos, and the New Athos monastery had much less occupancy than anticipated.

In 1924, during the Soviet persecution of religion, the monastery was closed. It was later used as a storage facility, tourist base, hospital and museum. Its return to the Orthodox Church began in 1994, after the end of the war.

The scenic setting of the New Athos monastery by the sea has made it a popular destination with Russian tourists visiting Abkhazia. An older church of St. Simon the Canaanite, dated to the 9th-10th century and reconstructed in the 1880s, is located near the town, on the Psyrtskha stream.

Hydroelectric power station
New Athos has a small hydroelectric power station and artificial lake on the Psyrtskha river, close to the old Church of St. Simon the Canaanite. The station was built by the monks of the monastery between 1892 and 1903 and repaired in 1922. It remained broken for over forty years before being repaired again – it was re-opened on 4 June 2012. It produces an estimated 100 kW "per hour " for the monastery which still owns it.

Cave

New Athos cave is a karst cave in the Iverian Mountain, few km far from the town. Since 1975 it is served by the New Athos Cave Railway.

Twin towns – sister cities

New Athos is twinned with:
 Sergiyev Posad, Russia
 Sarov, Russia
 Ryazan, Russia

See also
Mount Athos

References

External links

Hydroturbine Pelton on Mount Athos 100 kw Athos Greece (video)

Populated places in Gudauta District
Sukhum Okrug
Georgian Black Sea coast